is a video game developed and published by Tomy for the 3DO.

Gameplay 

Yū Yū Hakusho is a fighting game based on the Yuu Yuu Hakusho anime. The player has a choice of 15 characters, each of which has its own special and hyper moves. The animation for the characters was drawn by the animation studio responsible for the TV animation.

Synopsis

Development and release

Reception 

Next Generation reviewed the game, rating it one star out of five, and stated that "The special moves, while simple enough to execute, range from run-of-the-mill to boring. Avoid this one at all costs." Nick Rox reviewed the game for GameFan in March 1995, stating "Yu Yu Hakusho is an excellent, well-rounded fighting game, and an admirable first effort from 32-Bit newcomer Tomy, that will most probably never come out in the US. If you're starved for a few 3DO brawler or are a fan of the series, don't pass up this fine import." Spanish magazine GamesTech commended its animated cutscenes and visuals.

Notes

References

External links 
 Yū Yū Hakusho at GameFAQs
 Yū Yū Hakusho at Giant Bomb

1994 video games
3DO Interactive Multiplayer games
3DO Interactive Multiplayer-only games
Fighting games
Hudson Soft games
Japan-exclusive video games
Tose (company) games
Video games based on anime and manga
Video games developed in Japan

YuYu Hakusho games